Dempster Street is a major east-west street in the northern suburbs of Chicago.

The road begins at Illinois Route 62 (Algonquin Road) in Mount Prospect.  From there, it goes east and enters Des Plaines, where it intersects Illinois Route 83 (Elmhurst Road).  At Mount Prospect Road in Des Plaines, Dempster Street becomes Thacker Street until the eastern end of its western segment at Des Plaines River Road in Des Plaines.  Just west of its east end, Thacker Street intersects U.S. Routes 12 and 45.

Dempster Street resumes at Rand Road and Interstate 294 (Tri-State Tollway) in Des Plaines and Park Ridge.  At this point, U.S. Route 14 joins the road.  Dempster Street, as well as U.S. Route 14, continues west as Miner Street.  In Niles and Park Ridge, the road intersects Cumberland Avenue and Illinois Route 21 (Milwaukee Avenue).  In Morton Grove, Harlem Avenue intersects U.S. Route 14.  At Waukegan Road in Morton Grove, U.S. Route 14 goes south, following Illinois Route 43.  U.S. Route 14 splits just south of here and becomes Caldwell Avenue.  It is also at this point that Dempster Street picks up Illinois Route 58.  Illinois Route 58 continues north on Waukegan Road.  Further east into Skokie, Dempster Street intersects Interstate 94 (Edens Expressway) as well as U.S. Route 41 (Skokie Boulevard).  Illinois Route 58 ends at U.S. Route 41.  While still in Skokie, the road intersects Crawford Avenue.  The road then enters Evanston and intersects Ridge Avenue.  Dempster Street finally ends at a cul-de-sac at the shores of Lake Michigan in Evanston.

Major intersections

References

Streets in Chicago
U.S. Route 14